Ramona Ash is a former Cook Islands international lawn bowler.

Bowls career
Ash has represented the Cook Islands at the Commonwealth Games, in the fours at the 1994 Commonwealth Games.

She rose to prominence after winning the singles gold medal at the 1987 Asia Pacific Bowls Championships in  Lae, Papua New Guinea.

References

Living people
Year of birth missing (living people)
Bowls players at the 1994 Commonwealth Games
Cook Island female bowls players